Cosmopolitan Hotel may refer to:

 Cosmopolitan Hotel Tribeca in Tribeca, New York City
 Cosmopolitan of Las Vegas ("The Cosmo"), a resort casino and hotel in Paradise, Nevada
 Cosmopolitan Hotel and Restaurant in Old Town San Diego, California
 Dorsett Wanchai Hong Kong Hotel (formerly Cosmopolitan Hotel Hong Kong), a Hong Kong hotel

See also 
 Cosmopolitan (disambiguation)